Niko Guido (born 1966, Istanbul) is a Turkish-French photographer.

After finishing Galatasaray High School, he graduated from Boğaziçi University. He opened exhibitions in Venice, Paris, İzmir and İstanbul; his photographs have published on magazines and newspapers.

Then he has held exhibitions in more than 40 cities in Turkey and all around the world, while his photographs have been featured in many local and international newspapers and magazines. His success in nude photography brought him a respectable reputation on the international scene.

Following his collaboration on the photography project “Unobstructed Laughter” in support of The Spinal Cord Paralytics Association of Turkey, he traveled the world to portray life in different countries. The photographs he took during those journeys have been published in numerous magazines including National Geographic.

After the Haiti Earthquake, he collaborated with UNICEF, an organization he later worked with to organize the exhibition Van İçin Destek (Support for Van) which brought together 30 master photographers.

As part of the anti-war project Leave Us Alone, which he realized with Doctors without Borders on the 10th anniversary of the Iraq War, his photographs were simultaneously exhibited in 32 cities around the world, making it the world’s largest photography exhibition.

Niko Guido, has organized more than 60 exhibitions in Turkey and abroad.

Niko Guido opened the exhibition “Artist as an Art Object” for the benefit of the Turkish Education Foundation in 2014 and continues to contribute to the art of photography with his many projects. In specific, Guido initiated or provided guidance for the following projects:

I’m Istanbul,
Istanbul 365 Days,
Women’s Eye,
14 Cities,
PhotoMarathon,
Human Stories

In 2013, Guido received the special jury award at the FIAP World Cup, one of the world’s most prestigious photography competitions. The artist continues to explore and portray the world, and to realize an array of projects with his group, PhotoTravelers.

Awards 
 World Championship, (Batterphoto 2007, "Water Muse")

Newspapers, Magazines, Books 
 Nude Art Today, (2008-2009, France)
 National Geographic

Exhibitions

Photography Projects

Documentaries and TV Shows

References 

Living people
Turkish photographers
1966 births